Storegut is a mountain on the border of Vang Municipality in Innlandet county and Luster Municipality in Vestland county, Norway. The mountain is surrounded by several other notable mountains including Uranostinden and Langeskavltinden to the west, Langeskavlen to the southwest, Høgbrothøgdi to the east, and Snøholstinden and Store Rauddalseggje to the northeast.

Name
The name is a compound word made up of stor which means 'big' and gut which means 'boy', therefore together, the name means "Big Boy". It is common to compare mountains with persons in many Norwegian place names.

See also
List of mountains of Norway by height

References

Vang, Innlandet
Luster, Norway
Mountains of Innlandet
Mountains of Vestland
One-thousanders of Norway